Luiz Antonio Ribeiro, better known as Luizão (Sâo Paulo, 22 October 1968), is a football manager and a former Brazilian footballer who used to play as a midfielder.

Career
During the 1990s he played for several traditional Brazilian clubs such as C.A Juventus, Cruzeiro, Portuguesa, A.D. São Caetano, Comercial-RP and Vila Nova.

After finishing his career as a football player, he started a career as a football coach. From 2015 until 2019 he was the Brazil women's national under-17 football team coach in the 2016 FIFA U-17 Women's World Cup and 2018 FIFA U-17 Women's World Cup.

In 2020 he became the Juventus u-20 coach.

References

Campeonato Brasileiro Série A players
Clube Atlético Juventus managers
Clube Atlético Juventus players
1968 births
Living people
Brazilian footballers
Association football midfielders